Below is a list of existing and former magazines in Estonia. This list is incomplete.

See also
List of newspapers in Estonia

References

Estonia
Magazines
List